Gnathocera varians is a species of beetles belonging to the family Scarabaeidae.

Description

Distribution
This species occurs in the afrotropical region (Senegal, Burkina Faso, Guinea-Bissau, Mali);

Subspecies
 Gnathocera varians histrionica De Lisle, 1947
 Gnathocera varians roseni Schürhoff, 1939
 Gnathocera varians varians Gory & Percheron, 1833

References
 Biolib
 Global Species

Cetoniinae
Beetles described in 1833